The Sumathi Best Television Announcer Award is presented annually in Sri Lanka by the Sumathi Group of Campany associated with many commercial brands for the best Sri Lankan announcer of the year in television screen.

The award was first given in 2002, under the title best announcer. In 2009, the award was separated for two as Best Announcer and Best Presenter. Since 2011, the award is given to the best three announcers. Following is a list of the winners of this prestigious title since then.

References

Awards established in 2002
2002 establishments in Sri Lanka